Balurghat Law College is a law college in Balurghat, Dakshin Dinajpur, West Bengal. It was established in the year 2001. It is the only law college in the entire district and its neighboring district of Maldah. The college is affiliated to University of Gour Banga. This college is also approved by the Bar Council of India.

Courses 
The college offers a five-year integrated B.A. LL.B. (Hons.) course.

See also
List of institutions of higher education in West Bengal
Education in India
Education in West Bengal
List of law schools in India

References

External links 

University of Gour Banga
University Grants Commission
National Assessment and Accreditation Council

Law schools in West Bengal
Universities and colleges in Dakshin Dinajpur district
Colleges affiliated to University of Gour Banga
Educational institutions established in 2001
2001 establishments in West Bengal